Tom Christiansen (born 3 February 1956) is a Norwegian former ski jumper who competed in the World Cup 1979/80.

World Cup

Standings

Wins

References

1956 births
Living people
Norwegian male ski jumpers
Skiers from Oslo